Brendan O'Neill is a British pundit and author. He was the editor of Spiked from 2007 to September 2021, and is its "chief political writer". He has been a columnist for The Australian, The Big Issue, and The Spectator.

Once a Trotskyist, O'Neill was formerly a member of the Revolutionary Communist Party and wrote for the party's journal Living Marxism. O'Neill self identifies as a Marxist libertarian.

Career
He began his career at Spiked'''s predecessor, Living Marxism, the journal of the Revolutionary Communist Party, which ceased publication after ITN won their libel action following the journal accusing ITN of misrepresenting a picture of a prison camp during the Bosnian war.

Since then, O'Neill has contributed articles to publications in the United Kingdom, the United States and Australia including The Spectator, the New Statesman, BBC News Online, The Christian Science Monitor, The American Conservative, Salon, Rising East and occasionally blogged for The Guardian, before moving to The Daily Telegraph. He writes a column for The Big Issue in London and The Australian in Sydney. He also writes articles for The Sun.

O'Neill has served as a visiting fellow and columnist with the Australian libertarian think-tank, the Centre for Independent Studies, as well as being a keynote speaker for the pro-Israel advocacy organisation StandWithUs.

Writing as the fictional character "Ethan Greenhart", O'Neill is the author of Can I Recycle My Granny?, a satire of the green movement published by Hodder & Stoughton in 2008.

Views

Northern Ireland

O'Neill is a supporter of a united Ireland, having said that former Taoiseach Leo Varadkar is "not the ruler of the six counties, unfortunately, in my view. I am in favour of Irish unity, as it happens."

O'Neill has described the Orange Order as an "organisation which was founded in 1795 with the sole purpose of intimidating Catholics and Irish nationalists"
and which "played an important role in defending the sectarian set-up in Northern Ireland and in ensuring that Catholics were denied their basic civil rights." O'Neill has also been critical of the Parades Commission established to monitor parades in Northern Ireland.

O'Neill was critical of the 1998 Good Friday Agreement, which Sinn Féin and the Provisional IRA supported. O'Neill wrote, in a 1998 issue of Living Marxism, "The new peace deal is a disgrace... The biggest losers in all this are the republican movement... [W]hat exactly will the republican communities gain at the end of their 25-year struggle? Sinn Fein and the IRA have not just agreed to down arms. They have effectively signed away everything they once stood for, accepting that there will not be a united Ireland."

Sexual abuse

In a 2012 Huffington Post article, O'Neill argued against victims of sexual abuse by high-profile individuals like Sir Jimmy Savile coming forward publicly, stating: "I think there is more virtue in keeping the abuse as a firm part of your past, rather than offering it up to a scandal-hungry media and abuse-obsessed society that are desperate for more episodes of perversion to pore over".

Homosexuality

O'Neill has characterized the increasing acceptance of homosexuality as "queer imperialism" in terms of LGBT rights being promoted to Russia by western activists. He also claims that the depiction of homophobia as "a mental disorder" mirrors the way that homosexuality was once depicted, and criticized the legalization of same-sex marriage in Australia, made possible by public referendum, arguing that it has been "attended by authoritarianism wherever it’s been introduced." He cited concerns it may impinge on religious freedom and feared the demonization of those who disagreed with the expansion of marriage.

Racism

O'Neill considers efforts to combat racism in football to be "a class war" driven by "elites' utter incomprehension of the mass passions that get aired at football matches". Referring to high-profile cases of racial abuse and alleged racial abuse, he argued, "these incidents and alleged incidents are not racism at all, in the true meaning of the word", due to the levels of passion involved, describing anti-racism efforts as "a pretty poisonous desire to police the ... working classes". In 2020, when football fans booed players taking a knee to protest racism, he wrote that it showed "their disapproval of the colonisation of the beautiful game by the divisive cult of identity politics" and a working class reaction against the "virtue-signalling nonsense of Black Lives Matter". He has also described the far right Football Lads Alliance as a "working-class movement" against "terrorism and the ideologies that fuel it".

Religion

O'Neill has described himself as "an atheistic libertarian". He criticised opposition to Pope Benedict XVI's visit to the United Kingdom as intolerant and fearmongering.

Environmentalism

O'Neill has opposed efforts to combat climate change through reductions in carbon emissions, and instead advocates for "technological progress". He has said that the environmental movement has become a "religious cult" and a "waging war on the working class". He criticised the Swedish environmentalist activist Greta Thunberg in his 2019 article "The Cult of Greta Thunberg" in which he describes her as a "millenarian weirdo" and criticises what he describes as the "monotone voice" speech patterns of the Swedish environmentalist. O'Neill has described warnings concerning overpopulation as a "Malthusian" interference in women's right to reproductive freedom.

Brexit

In September 2019, he said on the BBC's Politics Live'' that British people should be rioting about delays to Brexit. He said: "I'm amazed that there haven't been riots yet." When asked by guest presenter Adam Fleming: "Do you think there will be riots?", O'Neill responded: "I think there should be." In October 2019, 585 complaints about him calling for riots were dismissed by the BBC's executive complaints unit. In 2020, O'Neill called for loud, open celebrations of Brexit, which formally took place on 31 January 2020, describing such celebrations as celebrations of democracy.

COVID-19

In 2020, in relation to COVID-19, he has argued that "this pandemic has shown us what life would be like if environmentalists got their way" and condemned the "chilling" and "dangerous" "witch-hunting of those who criticise the response to coronavirus".

Bibliography

Sources

External links
 Personal website

Living people
British bloggers
British political writers
British atheists
British male journalists
British people of Irish descent
British republicans
Online journalists
Year of birth missing (living people)
The Australian journalists
Free speech activists
British libertarians
British social commentators
British opinion journalists
Male bloggers
Revolutionary Communist Party (UK, 1978) members